is a Japanese speed skater.

Biography 
Kikuchi won bronze at the 2011 Asian Speed Skating Championships and silver at the 2012 Asian Speed Skating Championships. With these results she qualified for the World Allround Speed Skating Championships in both 2011 (finished 22nd) and 2012 (finished 19th).

In the 2014 Winter Olympics Kikuchi participated in the 1500 meters, finishing 31st, and was part of the women's team pursuit, who finished fourth.

In 2015 Ayaka Kikuchi became a world champion, when in the 2015 World Single Distance Speed Skating Championships she won the gold medal in the team pursuit where she participated together with the sisters Miho and Nana Takagi.

In 2018, Kikuchi was part of the Japanese team that won the Olympics women team pursuit gold medal.

Personal records

Honours
Medal with Purple Ribbon (2018)

See also
 World record progression team pursuit speed skating women

References

Ayaka Kikuchi at Speedskatingresults.com
Ayaka Kikuchi at SpeedSkatingNews.info

1987 births
Japanese female speed skaters
Speed skaters at the 2014 Winter Olympics
Speed skaters at the 2018 Winter Olympics
Olympic speed skaters of Japan
Place of birth missing (living people)
Living people
Medalists at the 2018 Winter Olympics
Olympic medalists in speed skating
Olympic gold medalists for Japan
Recipients of the Medal with Purple Ribbon
World Single Distances Speed Skating Championships medalists
21st-century Japanese women